MRSD may stand for:

Mainland Regional School District in Linwood, New Jersey, USA
Manchester Regional School District in Haledon, New Jersey, USA
Monadnock Regional School District in Swanzey, New Hampshire, USA
Monmouth Regional School District in Tinton Falls, New Jersey, USA
Masters in Robotic Systems Development at Carnegie Mellon University